Kévin Sebastien Appin (born 20 January 1998) is a French professional footballer who plays as a midfielder for Segunda División club Ibiza.

Club career
A youth product of the AS Monaco FC academy, Appin was loaned to Cercle Brugge on 16 June 2018. Appin made his professional debut with Cercle Brugge in a 4–0 Belgian First Division A loss to Club Brugge KV on 29 September 2018.

On 4 October 2020, Appin moved abroad and joined Hércules in the Spanish Segunda División B. On 8 June 2021, after featuring regularly, he joined newly promoted Segunda División club Ibiza on a one-year deal.

International career
Appin was born in mainland France and is of Martiniquais descent. He was called up to the Martinique national team for 2022–23 CONCACAF Nations League matches in June 2022.

References

External links

 AS Monaco Profile

1998 births
Living people
Footballers from Marseille
French footballers
French people of Martiniquais descent
AS Monaco FC players
Cercle Brugge K.S.V. players
Association football midfielders
Belgian Pro League players
Championnat National 2 players
Segunda División B players
Hércules CF players
UD Ibiza players
French expatriate footballers
French expatriate sportspeople in Belgium
Expatriate footballers in Belgium
French expatriate sportspeople in Monaco
Expatriate footballers in Monaco
Expatriate footballers in Spain